The Kaleun people (also called Laoeng) are an ethnic group of Thailand and Laos.

Other names

Prefixes
Tai Kaleun
Lao Kaleun

Variations
Kaleung
Kalung
Kalerng
Kelung
Khalong

Ethnicity
The Kaleun are a Tai ethnic group. However, they may have been descended from Bru people who shifted to a Southwestern Tai language resembling Phuthai and Yoy, as the Vietnamese also refer to the Bru as Ka Leung. Chamberlain (2016) conjectures that the Kaleun may have originally been Vietic speakers.

Geographic distribution
Mukdahan Province of Thailand
Nakhon Phanom Province of Thailand
Sakhon Nakhon Province of Thailand
Borikhamxai Province of Laos

Religions
Theravada Buddhism

Language
The Kaleun typically speak Northeastern Thai as their primary language.

References

Ethnic groups in Thailand